The Eastern States Agency was an agency or grouping of princely states in eastern India, during the latter years of the Indian Empire. It was created in 1933, by the unification of the former Chhattisgarh States Agency and the Orissa States Agency; the agencies remained intact within the grouping. In 1936, the Bengal States Agency was added.

History 

Since the 19th century the princely states and the tributary states of Orissa and Chhota Nagpur were not part of Bengal, but British relations with them were managed by its government through the Bengal Presidency.

The Eastern States Agency was created on 1 April 1933. This agency dealt with forty-two princely states in eastern India, located in the present-day Indian states of Chhattisgarh, Jharkhand, Odisha, West Bengal and Tripura. Before the creation of the Eastern States Agency in 1933, twenty-three native states of the former Orissa Tributary States and Chhota Nagpur States were under the suzerainty of the British provinces of Bihar and Orissa and sixteen were under that of the Central Provinces.

The Agent reported to the Governor General of India and two Political Agents under his supervision were posted at Sambalpur and Raipur. 
 
Cooch Behar and Tripura were transferred from Bengal Province to the Eastern States Agency on 1 November 1936.

On 1 December 1944, the status of this agency was raised to that of a first class residency. These states were grouped into three political agencies, under the "Resident" in Calcutta. The headquarters of the Orissa States Agency was at Sambalpur, the headquarters of the Chhattisgarh States Agency was at Raipur and the headquarters of the Bengal States Agency was at Calcutta. After the withdrawal of the British from India in 1947, the states acceded to the new Union of India and some of the states formed the Eastern States Union, an organisation that failed. Later they were integrated into the Indian states of Madhya Pradesh, Bihar, West Bengal and Orissa. The eastern portion of Madhya Pradesh and the southern portion of Bihar became the states of Chhattisgarh and Jharkhand, respectively, in November 2000.

Link to the Map of Eastern States Agency

Princely states of the Eastern States Agency

Orissa States Agency 
Salute states, by precedence : 
 Kalahandi, title HH Maharaja, Hereditary salute of 9-guns
 Mayurbhanj, title HH Maharaja, Hereditary salute of 9-guns
 Patna, title HH Maharaja, Hereditary salute of 9-guns
 Sonepur, title HH Maharaja, Hereditary salute of 9-guns

Non-salute states, alphabetically :

 Athgarh, title Raja
 Athmallik, title Raja
 Bamra, title Raja
 Baramba, title Rawat
 Baudh, title Raja
 Bonai, title Raja
 Daspalla, title Raja
 Dhenkanal, title Raja (from 1869 Maharaja)
 Gangpur, title Raja
 Hindol, title Raja
 Keonjhar, title Raja
 Khandpara, title Raja
 Kharsawan, title Thakur (from 1907 Raja)
 Nayagarh, title Raja
 Narsinghpur, title Raja
 Nilgiri, title Raja
 Pal Lahara, title Raja
 Rairakhol, title Raja
 Ranpur, title Raja
 Saraikela (Seraikela), title Kunwar (from 1884 Raja)
 Talcher, title Raja
 Tigiria, title Raja

Chhattisgarh States Agency 
Only non-salute states :

 Bastar, title Raja (from 1936 Maharaja)
 Changbhakar (Chang Bhakar), title Raja (from 1865, Bhaiya)
 Chhuikandan (Kondka), title Mahant
 Jashpur, title Raja
 Kanker, title Maharajadhiraja
 Kawardha, title Thakur
 Khairagarh, title Raja
 Koriya (Korea), title Raja
 (Raj) Nandgaon, title Manhat
 Raigarh, title Raja Bahadur
 Sakti, title Rana
 Sarangarh, title Raja
 Surguja, title Raja (from 1820 HH Maharaja Bahadur)
 Udaipur State, title Raja Bahadur

Bengal States Agency 
Salute states :
 Cooch Behar, title Maharaja, Hereditary salute of 13-guns 
 Tripura, title Maharaja, Hereditary salute of 13-guns

See also 
 Political integration of India

References

External links and Sources 
 WorldStatesmen – India – Princely States

Agencies of British India
History of Odisha
History of Chhattisgarh
1933 establishments in India
1947 disestablishments in India
Bengal Presidency